Karl Josef Müller (19 January 1865, Hamburg – 29 October 1942, Theresienstadt Ghetto) was a German genre painter and lithographer; of Jewish ancestry.

Biography 
He was born to Abraham Müller, a cigar manufacturer, and his wife, Henriette née Burchard. He completed his studies at the Prussian Academy of Arts.

Back in Hamburg, he was a one-year volunteer with an infantry regiment; making drawings for use by his unit. This inspired him to continue creating works on military subjects for many years. The   (Artists' Association) acquired several such works for raffles and lotteries. 

In 1903, at the age of thirty-eight, he married Louise Rebecca Franziska Hauer, the daughter of Martin Hauer, a soap and perfume manufacturer. They had two daughters: Karla (1904), who became a singer, and Lotte (1911), who became an actress.

Jüdischer Kulturbund. He was too old to participate in World War I, and ceased painting military subjects when it was over. During the period of hyperinflation, he lost all of his money, and his family was forced to move frequently. Despite this, they were able to spend some time in Denmark and Sweden.

After the National Socialist party came to power, they established the Reich Chamber of Culture (1933), which all artists were required to join. Artists of Jewish descent were, of course, excluded. He was not formally excluded from the Chamber until 1938. During those years, he participated in the activities of the Jüdischer Kulturbund, which had also been established in 1933. He was totally dependent on welfare by 1941. As the situation worsened, he made an apparently futile effort to save his remaining paintings by sending them abroad.

In July 1942, he and Louise were moved to a collection point for "deportation". From there, they were taken by train to Bauschowitz, then had to walk three kilometers to Theresienstadt. They were part of the first group to arrive. He died there in October; allegedly from heart failure. The art historian, has concluded that he actually died of starvation. In May 1944, Louise was moved to the Auschwitz concentration camp. The exact date of her death is unknown.

Most of his works have been preserved in private collections. Some are in the Museum for Hamburg History. His paintings and drawings were reproduced in several publications, including Die Gartenlaube, as well as the above-mentioned Hamburger Fremdenblatt.

Sources 
 "Müller, Karl", In: Friedrich von Boetticher: Malerwerke des 19. Jahrhunderts, Beitrag zur Kunstgeschichte, Vol.2, 1898, pg.100 (Online)
 "Müller, Karl", In: Dresslers Kunsthandbuch 1907, pg.140 (Online)
 "Müller, Karl", In: Ernst Rump: Lexikon der bildenden Künstler Hamburgs, Altonas und der näheren Umgebung, Otto Bröcker & Co., Hamburg 1912, pg.92 (Online)
 "Müller, Karl", In: Allgemeines Lexikon der Bildenden Künstler von der Antike bis zur Gegenwart, Vol. 25: Moehring–Olivié, E. A. Seemann, Leipzig 1931
 Maike Bruhns: Kunst in der Krise, Vol.2: "Künstlerlexikon Hamburg 1933–1945", Dölling und Galitz, 2001, pp. 294–295

External links 

 Karl Josef Müller, biography @ Stolpersteine Hamburg, with a photograph of him and his family.
 More works by Müller @ ArtNet
 Small drawings by Müller @ 

1865 births
1942 deaths
19th-century German painters
19th-century German male artists
Jewish painters
German genre painters
German lithographers
Prussian Academy of Arts alumni
German people who died in the Theresienstadt Ghetto
Painters from Hamburg
20th-century German painters
20th-century German male artists